La Esperanza Airport  is an airport serving a number of agricultural villages and towns in western Colón Department, Honduras.  The largest nearby towns are Sonaguera (13 km) and Sabá (17 km).

See also

 Transport in Honduras
 List of airports in Honduras

References

External links
 FallingRain - La Esperanza Airport
 HERE Maps - La Esperanza
 OpenStreetMap - La Esperanza Airport
 OurAirports - La Esperanza

Airports in Honduras
Colón Department (Honduras)